Nguyễn Văn Mạnh (born 16 June 1993) is a Vietnamese footballer who plays as a left-back for V.League 2 club Long An

References 

1993 births
Living people
Vietnamese footballers
Association football fullbacks
Song Lam Nghe An FC players
Can Tho FC players
Long An FC players
V.League 1 players
People from Nghệ An province
Footballers at the 2014 Asian Games
Asian Games competitors for Vietnam